Bonannia is a monotypic genus of flowering plant in the family Apiaceae. Its only species is Bonannia graeca. It is endemic to southern Europe (southern mainland Italy, Sicily and southern Greece).

References 

Flora of Europe
Apioideae
Monotypic Apioideae genera